Valašské Meziříčí is a town in Vsetín District in the Zlín Region of the Czech Republic. It has about 22,000 inhabitants. The historic town centre is well preserved and is protected by law as an urban monument zone.

Administrative parts
Town parts and villages of Bynina, Hrachovec, Juřinka, Krásno nad Bečvou, Lhota and Podlesí are administrative parts of Valašské Meziříčí.

Etymology

The name Meziříčí literally means "between the rivers" and is related to its location on the confluence of rivers. The attribute Valašské (i.e. "Wallachian") refers to its locations in the region of Moravian Wallachia.

Geography
The Vsetínská Bečva and Rožnovská Bečva rivers join in the town to form the Bečva River.

The municipal territory of Valašské Meziříčí lies in three geomorphological regions. The western and northern parts lie in the Moravian-Silesian Foothills, the eastern part lies in the Rožnov Valley, and the southern part lies in the Hostýn-Vsetín Mountains.

History
The first written mention of Valašské Meziříčí is from 1297. The village on the left bank of the Rožnovská Bečva was first referred to as a town in 1377. Krásno nad Bečvou was founded on the right bank of the Rožnovská Bečva and in 1491 it was promoted to a market town. Krásno nad Bečvou was a separate entity until 1924, when it was merged with Valašské Meziříčí, however, their history is similar and they had common owners.

The most significant owner of the two manors was the Zierotin family, who had built a Renaissance castle here. In the 19th century, Valašské Meziříčí became the centre of education and Krásno nad Bečvou was industrialized.

Demographics

Economy
Valašské Meziříčí has a tradition of chemical, automotive and food industry. The town is known for one of the largest chemical plants in Europe, DEZA a.s., a part of the Agrofert conglomerate. The plant was founded in 1960 and is focused on processing of tar and benzene.

The Moravská gobelínová manufaktura is a unique tapestry manufactory established in 1898.

Sights

Valašské Meziříčí has a small historic centre formed by the town square and its surroundings, including the Žerotín Castle. The town square is lined by preserved burger houses. One of the most valuable monuments of the historic centre is the parish Church of the Assumption of the Virgin Mary. The originally Gothic church was first mentioned in 1419, after it replaced an old church from the 13th century. The Renaissance tower with a portal was added in 1581 and the Baroque Chapel of the Virgin Mary was added in 1681–1682. In the mid-18th century, the church was baroque rebuilt.

The Žerotín Castle is one of the main landmarks of the town. Construction of the castle was started by John III of Pernstein in the first half of the 16th century. The originally Renaissance castle was baroque rebuilt by the Zierotins. After it was used as a women's prison and military infirmary in the 20th century, it was reconstructed and today serves as a cultural centre of the town.

The Kinský Castle was originally a Baroque building which housed the Krásno manor administration. In the mid-19th century it was rebuilt by the Kinsky family to an Empire style castle. Since 1949, the castle has been used as a museum, today the Wallachian Regional Museum. Adjacent to the castle is a large English park with valuable tree species, founded at the turn of the 18th and 19th centuries.

The Moravská gobelínová manufaktura includes a museum of tapestry manufactory and a gallery of modern and historical tapestries.

The Holocaust Monument from 2004 is located on the site of a synagogue which was destroyed during the World War II.

Notable people

Franziskus von Sales Bauer (1841–1915), Roman Catholic cardinal
Bohumil Mořkovský (1899–1928), gymnast
Chaim Yahil (1905–1974), Israeli diplomat
Rudolf Pernický (1915–2005), soldier and paratrooper
František Hanus (1916–1991), actor
Václav Kašlík (1917–1989), composer, opera director and conductor
Jiří Dadák (1926–2014), athlete
Jiří Křižan (1941–2010), screenwriter, writer and politician
Alena Mornštajnová (born 1963), writer and translator
František Jež (born 1970), ski jumper
René Bolf (born 1974), footballer
Helena Zeťová (born 1980), singer
Milan Baroš (born 1981), footballer
Jaroslav Levinský (born 1981), tennis player
Iveta Benešová (born 1983), tennis player
Robin Kovář (born 1984), ice hockey player
Josef Vávra (born 1984), ice hockey player
Tomáš Berdych (born 1985), tennis player
Miroslav Jurka (born 1987), handball player
Markéta Irglová (born 1988), musician and actress
Petra Smaržová (born 1990), Slovak disabled skier
Martin Doležal (born 1990), footballer
Peter Šlachta (born 1993), handball player

Twin towns – sister cities

Valašské Meziříčí is twinned with:

 Balchik, Bulgaria
 Budva, Montenegro
 Čačak, Serbia 
 Čadca, Slovakia
 Gooise Meren, Netherlands
 Konin, Poland
 Partizánske, Slovakia
 Sevlievo, Bulgaria
 Velké Meziříčí, Czech Republic

References

External links

Cities and towns in the Czech Republic
Populated places in Vsetín District
Moravian Wallachia